Maksim  Aleksandrovich Shatskikh (born 30 August 1978) is an Uzbek professional football coach of Pakhtakor Tashkent and a former player.

He is widely regarded as one of the best Uzbek player of all time and is currently the top goalscorer of the national team with 34 goals in 61 games. Shatskikh is the joint all-time top scorer of the Ukrainian Premier League with 123 goals in 341 games together with Serhii Rebrov. He spent a decade playing for Dynamo Kyiv from 1999 to 2009.

On 28 July 1999, Shatskikh became the first Asian player to score in the UEFA Champions League and is only the second Uzbek player, after Mirjalol Kasymov, to score in UEFA football competitions. At international level, he played in three AFC Asian Cups for Uzbekistan, helping them to fourth place in 2011.

Most recently he played for Rukh Vynnyky. On 8 April 2016, it was announced that he ended his playing career and became a coaching staff of the Dynamo football academy.

His brother Oleg Shatskikh is also a former footballer.

Career

Dynamo Kyiv
After playing for clubs in Uzbekistan and Russia in his earlier career he was signed by Ukrainian Premier League's Dynamo Kyiv as a replacement for Andriy Shevchenko, who was acquired by A.C. Milan in 1999. In his first season at Dynamo, he scored two goals in a 3–2 win over Karpaty Lviv to clinch Dynamo's 8th consecutive league title. He was labeled the "next Shevchenko" in the media.

In his debut season for Dynamo Kyiv, he won the Ukrainian Premier League and became Ukrainian Premier League top scorer, scoring 20 goals. In the 2002–03 season, when he scored 22 goals to equal Serhii Rebrov's record haul of 1997–98 while also playing for Kyiv, Shatskikh scored 5 goals in his debut UEFA Champions League season 1999–2000. On 28 July 1999, he scored his first goal in the Champions League in a match against Žalgiris Vilnius. With Kyiv, Shatskikh managed to play 9 seasons in the UEFA Champions League, scoring 11 goals.

Arsenal Kyiv
After spending the 2009 season with Lokomotiv Astana in the Kazakhstan Premier League he returned to Kyiv, where he was signed by FC Arsenal Kyiv during the winter break. During his stay with Arsenal Kyiv, Shatskikh scored his 100th league goal. On 7 April 2010, the president of Arsenal Kyiv presented Shatskikh the Golden Ball award for scoring his 100th goal in the Ukrainian Premier League against Metalurh Zaporizhzhia. Arsenal president Vadym Rabinovych said that he had already ordered another Golden Ball for Shatskikh containing more gold for his future 200th goal in the Ukrainian Premier League.

At the start of the 2013–14 season, Shatskikh joined Arsenal Kyiv from fellow Ukrainian side Chornomorets Odesa.

Hoverla

On 30 December 2013, Shatskikh signed a 2.5-year contract with Hoverla Uzhhorod. On 27 July 2014, in Ukrainian Premier League match Hoverla Uzhhorod- Karpaty Lviv finished by draw 2–2, Shatskikh scored the first goal for the Hoverla side in the match and his 122nd in Ukrainian Premier League.

On 23 August 2014, in Ukrainian Cup away match against Cherkaskyi Dnipro Hoverla won by 2–1 and Shatskikh scored in the 67th minute the second goal of his team. After this match his total goals in the Ukrainian Cup reached 24 goals (as of 23 August 2014) and he became the 2nd best goalscorer of the tournament after Andriy Vorobey with 25 goals.

He is the highest goalscorer in the history of the Ukrainian Premier League with 124 goals, (as of 4 October 2014), surpassing Serhii Rebrov. Shatskikh scored his 124th goal on 4 October 2014 in a match against Zorya Luhansk lost by Hoverla with 2–1. He is also member of Oleh Blokhin club with 171 goals (as of 4 October 2014).

At the end of the 2014–15 season Shatskikh left the club, while under a contract and joined an amateur club from Lviv until the end of 2015. On 10 May 2016, he filed a case to Lausanne (Court of Arbitration for Sport) against Hoverla Uzhhorod administration for failure to pay him indebted salary. During the 2015–16 season Hoverla already was fined and had points deducted for not paying players' salaries on the decision of the Football Federation of Ukraine, yet according to Shatskikh his personal case that was filed in October 2015 was not yet reviewed by April 2016 and could stretch out for 10 years.

International career
Known since his performance at young age, he was available to represent for Uzbekistan and Russia. Immediately, he chose the former.

Shatskih was among the three best Asian players in 2005. On 13 October 2007, he scored 5 goals against Taiwan. On 2 June 2008, he scored a goal for Uzbekistan during a 7–3 win over Singapore in a World Cup 2010 qualification game and became joint top scorer for the national team with Mirjalol Kasymov. On 15 October 2008, he scored against Japan as well, thus becoming the all-time top scorer for his side. Another famous goal came against Iran in the 2014 WCQs effectively sealing Irans fate and ensuring the Uzbekis reaching the playoffs.

On 29 May 2014, Shatskikh played his farewell match for the national team in a friendly against Oman. He capped 61 matches for national team, scoring 34 goals. He is currently Uzbekistan's leading national team goalscorer of all-time.

Personal life
He is a naturalized citizen of Ukraine subsequently after his retirement from football.

Career statistics

Club

International

Scores and results list Uzbekistan's goal tally first, score column indicates score after each Shatskikh goal.

Honours

Player
Dynamo Kyiv
Ukrainian Championship: 1999–2000, 2000–01, 2002–03, 2003–04, 2006–07, 2008–09
Ukrainian Cup: 2000, 2003, 2005, 2006, 2007
Ukrainian Super Cup: 2004, 2006, 2007
Commonwealth of Independent States Cup: 2002

Uzbekistan
Asian Cup fourth place: 2011

Manager
Pakhtakor
 Uzbekistan Super League: 2022

Individual
Uzbekistan Footballer of the Year: 2003, 2005, 2006, 2007
Ukrainian Premier League top scorer: 1999–2000, 2002–03
Ukrainian Cup top scorer: 1999–2000, 2001–02, 2002–03
Serhiy Rebrov club: 124 goals
Oleh Blokhin club: 171 goals

References

External links

Official site of Dynamo Kyiv

Maksim Shatskikh's profile at uzfootball.uz
 

1978 births
Living people
Sportspeople from Tashkent
Uzbekistani footballers
Uzbekistan international footballers
Uzbekistani expatriate footballers
Expatriate footballers in Russia
Expatriate footballers in Ukraine
Expatriate footballers in Kazakhstan
FC Sokol Saratov players
FC Energiya Volzhsky players
FC Lada-Tolyatti players
FC SOYUZ-Gazprom Izhevsk players
FC Dynamo Kyiv players
FC Dynamo-2 Kyiv players
FC Dynamo-3 Kyiv players
FC Baltika Kaliningrad players
FC Arsenal Kyiv players
FC Chornomorets Odesa players
FC Hoverla Uzhhorod players
FC Rukh Lviv players
Ukrainian Premier League players
Ukrainian First League players
Ukrainian Second League players
Ukrainian Amateur Football Championship players
Uzbekistani people of Russian descent
Ukrainian people of Russian descent
2000 AFC Asian Cup players
2007 AFC Asian Cup players
2011 AFC Asian Cup players
FC Astana players
Ukrainian Cup top scorers
Ukrainian Premier League top scorers
Uzbekistani expatriate sportspeople in Kazakhstan
Uzbekistani expatriate sportspeople in Ukraine
Uzbekistani expatriate sportspeople in Russia
Uzbekistani football managers
Association football forwards
Naturalized citizens of Ukraine
Pakhtakor Tashkent FK managers